Arnold Carl Johansen (19 February 1898  –  29 July 1957) was a Norwegian politician for the Conservative Party.

He was born in Buksnes.

He was elected to the Norwegian Parliament from Nordland in 1950, but was not re-elected in 1954.

Johansen was a member of Hol municipality council from 1922 to 1950.

References

1898 births
1957 deaths
Conservative Party (Norway) politicians
Members of the Storting
20th-century Norwegian politicians